The Paddock Building is a historic commercial building located at 34 West Main Street in Malone, Franklin County, New York.

Description and history 
It was built in about 1848 and is a nearly square, six-bay-by-six-bay building with a rectangular rear wing. The main block is three and one half stories tall and rear wing is two stories. The walls are of sandstone construction and measure one and one half feet thick. It features a stone arcade across the front facade. It is believed to be the oldest extant commercial building in Franklin County.

It was listed on the National Register of Historic Places on November 7, 1976.

References

Commercial buildings on the National Register of Historic Places in New York (state)
Commercial buildings completed in 1848
Buildings and structures in Franklin County, New York
National Register of Historic Places in Franklin County, New York